KHMS (88.5 FM), "Sounds of the Spirit", is a radio station broadcasting a Contemporary Christian format. Licensed to Victorville, California, United States, it serves the Victor Valley area. The station is owned by Faith Communications Corp. and features programming provided from the SOS Radio Network.

Translators

References

External links

Victorville, California
HMS